John Langdon (June 26, 1741September 18, 1819) was an American politician and Founding Father from New Hampshire. He served as a delegate to the Constitutional Convention, signed the United States Constitution, and was one of the first two United States senators from New Hampshire.

As a member of the Continental Congress, Langdon was an early supporter of the Revolutionary War. He later served in the United States Congress for 12 years, including as the first president pro tempore of the Senate, before becoming president and later governor of New Hampshire. He turned down a nomination for U.S. vice presidential candidate in 1812.

Early life

Langdon's father was a prosperous farmer and local shipbuilder whose family had emigrated to America before 1660 from Sheviock, Caradon, Cornwall. The Langdons were among the first one of New England's major seaports. Langdon attended the local grammar school run by a veteran of the 1745 Siege of Louisbourg against the French at Fortress of Louisbourg in New France. After finishing his primary education, he and his older brother, Woodbury Langdon, rejected the opportunity to join in their father's successful agricultural livelihood and apprenticed themselves to local naval merchants.

By age 22, Langdon was captain of the cargo ship Andromache, sailing to the West Indies. Four years later he owned his first merchantman and would continue over time to acquire a small fleet of vessels engaging in the triangle trade between Portsmouth, the Caribbean, and London. His older brother was even more successful in international trade, and by 1777 both young men were among Portsmouth's wealthiest citizens.

American Revolution

British control of the shipping industries limited Langdon's business, motivating him to become a vigorous and prominent supporter of the revolutionary movement in the 1770s. He served on the New Hampshire committee of correspondence and a nonimportation committee and also attended various Patriot assemblies. In 1774, he participated in the seizure and confiscation of British munitions from Fort William and Mary. 

Langdon served as a member of the Second Continental Congress from 1775 to 1776, serving as a member of the Marine Committee. He was one of the signatories of the U.S. Constitution. He resigned from the Congress in June 1776 to become an agent for the Continental forces against the British and superintended the construction of several warships including the Raleigh, the America, and the Ranger. In 1777, he equipped an expedition against the British, participating in the Battle of Bennington and commanding Langdon's Company of Light Horse Volunteers at Saratoga and in Rhode Island.

Political career

In 1784, he built at Portsmouth the mansion now known as the Governor John Langdon House. Langdon was elected to two terms as president of New Hampshire, once between 1785 and 1786 and again between 1788 and 1789. He was a member of the Congress of the Confederation in 1787 and became president of the Constitutional Convention in 1787, serving as a member of the New Hampshire delegation. Langdon was elected to the U.S. Senate and served from March 4, 1789, to March 3, 1801. He was elected the first president pro tempore of the Senate on April 6, 1789, and also served as president pro tempore during the Second Congress.

During the 1787 constitutional debates in Philadelphia, Langdon spoke out against James Madison's proposed "negative" on state laws simply because he felt that should the Senate be granted this power and not the House of Representatives, it would "hurt the feelings" of House members. Langdon was an ardent supporter of the drive to ratify the Constitution of the United States in New Hampshire. On June 21, 1788, it was ratified by New Hampshire by a vote of 57-47. He immediately wrote to George Washington to inform him that New Hampshire had become the ninth state which he described as the "Key Stone in the Great Arch. Joshua Atherton, who campaigned against ratification, accepted the result and stated, 'It's adopted. Let’s try it'”.

In April 1789 Langdon served as president pro tempore of the U.S. Senate, prior to John Adams' election as vice president, and counted the votes of the electoral college in the first presidential election.

In 1798, Langdon assisted Oney Judge to evade Burwell Bassett, the nephew of George and Martha Washington, who had intended to kidnap Judge and return her to slavery with the Washingtons.

Langdon served as a member of the New Hampshire Legislature (1801–05), with the last two terms as speaker; he served as governor of New Hampshire from 1805 to 1812, except for a year between 1809 and 1810. In 1808, his niece, Catherine Whipple Langdon, married Edmund Roberts. Langdon declined the nomination to be a candidate for vice president with James Madison in 1812.

Death and legacy
Langdon died in Portsmouth in 1819 and was interred at the Langdon Tomb in the North Cemetery.  The town of Langdon, New Hampshire, is named after him, as is Langdon Street in Madison, Wisconsin, a city with numerous streets named after Founding Fathers.

See also
 New Hampshire Historical Marker No. 114: North Cemetery
 New Hampshire Historical Marker No. 127: John Langdon (1741–1819)

Notes

References
 
 "The Founding Fathers: New Hampshire." U.S. National Archives and Records Administration.
 
 State Builders: An Illustrated Historical and Biographical Record of the State of New Hampshire. State Builers Publishing Manchester, NH 1903
 Mayo, Lawrence Shaw. "John Langdon of New Hampshire". Port Washington, New York: Kennikat Press, 1937.

External links
 Governor John Langdon House, Historic New England
 

|-

|-

|-

|-

|-

|-

|-

1741 births
1819 deaths
Politicians from Portsmouth, New Hampshire
People of colonial New Hampshire
American people of Cornish descent
American Congregationalists
Continental Congressmen from New Hampshire
Signers of the United States Constitution
Pro-Administration Party United States senators from New Hampshire
Anti-Administration Party United States senators from New Hampshire
Democratic-Republican Party United States senators from New Hampshire
New Hampshire Democratic-Republicans
Presidents pro tempore of the United States Senate
1808 United States vice-presidential candidates
1812 United States vice-presidential candidates
Governors of New Hampshire
Democratic-Republican Party state governors of the United States
New Hampshire militiamen in the American Revolution
Burials in New Hampshire
Founding Fathers of the United States